The 1970 Challenge Cup was the 69th staging of rugby league's oldest knockout competition, the Challenge Cup.

The final was contested by Castleford and Wigan at Wembley in front of a crowd of 95,255. Castleford won the match 7–2.

The winner of the Lance Todd Trophy was Castleford , Bill Kirkbride.

First round

Second round

Quarter-finals

Semi-finals

Final

References

External links
Challenge Cup official website 
Challenge Cup 1969/70 results at Rugby League Project

Challenge Cup
Challenge Cup